In Greek mythology, the name Maeon or Maion (Ancient Greek: Μαίονος) may refer to:

Maeon of Thebes, son of Haemon, endowed with prophetic abilities. He was one of the fifty men that laid an ambush against Tydeus when he came to Thebes as the messenger of the Seven against Thebes. Defending himself, Tydeus killed all these men except Maeon, who was to be spared in accordance with the gods' will. Later, when Tydeus fell in the war of the Seven, Maeon gave burial to him, a local Theban version of the myth asserts.
Maeon, son of Haemon and Antigone, appears in a version of the myth according to which Haemon disobeyed Creon's orders to kill Antigone and hid her in a village, where she gave birth to a son. When the boy grew up, he came to Thebes to participate in ritual games and was identified by Creon, as all the descendants of the Spartoi had a special mark on their bodies. Despite the objections of Heracles, Creon killed the young man; Haemon then took both Antigone's and his own lives.
Maeon of Troy, father of Agelaus; his son was killed by Ajax.
Maeon, an ally of Turnus, brother of Numitor and Alcanor. Was killed by Aeneas.
Maeon (also Meion), king of Lydia and Phrygia. He and his wife Dindyme are the possible parents of Cybele. He had his daughter exposed at Mount Cybelus, but she was suckled by leopards and survived.

Notes

References 

 Apollodorus, The Library with an English Translation by Sir James George Frazer, F.B.A., F.R.S. in 2 Volumes, Cambridge, MA, Harvard University Press; London, William Heinemann Ltd. 1921. ISBN 0-674-99135-4. Online version at the Perseus Digital Library. Greek text available from the same website.
 Diodorus Siculus, The Library of History translated by Charles Henry Oldfather. Twelve volumes. Loeb Classical Library. Cambridge, Massachusetts: Harvard University Press; London: William Heinemann, Ltd. 1989. Vol. 3. Books 4.59–8. Online version at Bill Thayer's Web Site
 Diodorus Siculus, Bibliotheca Historica. Vol 1-2. Immanel Bekker. Ludwig Dindorf. Friedrich Vogel. in aedibus B. G. Teubneri. Leipzig. 1888-1890. Greek text available at the Perseus Digital Library.
 Gaius Julius Hyginus, Fabulae from The Myths of Hyginus translated and edited by Mary Grant. University of Kansas Publications in Humanistic Studies. Online version at the Topos Text Project.
 Homer, The Iliad with an English Translation by A.T. Murray, Ph.D. in two volumes. Cambridge, MA., Harvard University Press; London, William Heinemann, Ltd. 1924. . Online version at the Perseus Digital Library.
 Homer, Homeri Opera in five volumes. Oxford, Oxford University Press. 1920. . Greek text available at the Perseus Digital Library.
 Pausanias, Description of Greece with an English Translation by W.H.S. Jones, Litt.D., and H.A. Ormerod, M.A., in 4 Volumes. Cambridge, MA, Harvard University Press; London, William Heinemann Ltd. 1918. . Online version at the Perseus Digital Library
 Pausanias, Graeciae Descriptio. 3 vols. Leipzig, Teubner. 1903.  Greek text available at the Perseus Digital Library.
 Publius Papinius Statius, The Thebaid translated by John Henry Mozley. Loeb Classical Library Volumes. Cambridge, MA, Harvard University Press; London, William Heinemann Ltd. 1928. Online version at the Topos Text Project.
 Publius Papinius Statius, The Thebaid. Vol I-II. John Henry Mozley. London: William Heinemann; New York: G.P. Putnam's Sons. 1928. Latin text available at the Perseus Digital Library.
 Publius Vergilius Maro, Aeneid. Theodore C. Williams. trans. Boston. Houghton Mifflin Co. 1910. Online version at the Perseus Digital Library.
 Publius Vergilius Maro, Bucolics, Aeneid, and Georgics. J. B. Greenough. Boston. Ginn & Co. 1900. Latin text available at the Perseus Digital Library.
 Quintus Smyrnaeus, The Fall of Troy translated by Way. A. S. Loeb Classical Library Volume 19. London: William Heinemann, 1913. Online version at theio.com
 Quintus Smyrnaeus, The Fall of Troy. Arthur S. Way. London: William Heinemann; New York: G.P. Putnam's Sons. 1913. Greek text available at the Perseus Digital Library.

Kings in Greek mythology
Theban characters in Greek mythology